Kalleh Menar may refer to:

Kalleh Menar, Razavi Khorasan